Valmy, named after the Battle of Valmy, was the largest three-decker of the French Navy, and the largest tall ship ever built in France.

Design
The design of Valmy was decided by the Commission de Paris, as a way to modernise the 118-gun Océan class design and its derivatives. The most radical departure from previous designs was the shedding of tumblehome and adoption of vertical sides, shared by the Hercule and Suffren classes; this significantly increased the space available for upper batteries, but reduced the stability of the ship.

Valmy was laid down at Brest in 1838 as Formidable and launched in 1847.

She displayed poor performances during her trials, especially with a tendency to roll, and was generally considered a failure. The outcome of the project led the French Navy to return to a more traditional design with the next generation of ships, which would lead to Bretagne.

Career

Valmy participated in the Crimean War, where she proved difficult to manoeuvre and, like other sailing vessels, often had to be towed by steam ships. During the bombardment of Sevastopol, the only time Valmy fired her guns in anger, she was towed by the new steam two-decker Napoléon.

On 13 November 1855, Valmy collided with the French schooner Etoile du Nord in the Mediterranean Sea. The schooner was dismasted and Valmy put in to Málaga, Spain. She returned to Brest in 1855, where she was disarmed. In 1864, she was renamed Borda and became a training hulk for the French Naval Academy. Upon her replacement in 1890, she was renamed Intrépide. She was stricken from the navy list in 1891 and scrapped soon afterwards.

Gallery

Sources and references

Bibliography

External links
  dossiersmarine.free.fr

Ships of the line of the French Navy
Ships built in France
Crimean War naval ships of France
1847 ships